Russian involvement in regime change describes activities by the Russian government to replace foreign regimes through overt or covert interventions since the dissolution of the Soviet Union in 1991.

During the Soviet Union 

Previous to the 1991, the Soviet Union intervened in multiple governments primarily in Asia, acquiring the territory of Tuva and making Mongolia into a satellite state.

During World War II, the Soviet Union helped overthrow many Nazi German or Imperial Japanese puppet regimes, including in East Asia and much of Europe. 

It expanded the geographic scope of its actions beyond its traditional area of operations. One study indicated that the Soviet Union and Russia engaged in 36 interventions in foreign elections from 1946 to 2000.

The Soviet Union ratified the UN Charter in 1945, the preeminent international law document, which legally bound the Soviet government to the Charter's provisions, including Article 2(4), which prohibits the threat or use of force in international relations, except in very limited circumstances. Therefore, any legal claim advanced to justify regime change by a foreign power carries a particularly heavy burden.

1991–present

2000s

2004: Ukraine 

The Russian government publicly attempted to influence the 2004 Ukrainian presidential election. Russian President Vladimir Putin gave public support for candidate Viktor Yanukovych and made public visits to Ukraine on his behalf. According to Kempe and Solonenko, "The overall interest of the Russian elite was to keep Ukraine as a reliable neighbor and partner." This was accomplished by channeling Russian funding and expertise directly into the campaign of Yanukovych or the government of Ukraine, in an effort described as "nakedly partisan".

2008: Georgia 

In August 2008, Russia launched an invasion to neighbouring country Georgia. The country was part of Soviet Union gained independence in 1991. Russia cited the importance of the region as its justification to invade the country. Before the war broke out, one of President Mikheil Saakashvili's primary aims for Georgia was to become a member state of NATO, which has been one of the major stumbling blocks in Georgia–Russia relations. Although Georgia has no notable gas or oil reserves, its territory hosts part of the Baku–Tbilisi–Ceyhan pipeline supplying oil to Turkey.  Chief of the General Staff of the Russian Armed Forces Yuri Baluyevsky admitted in 2012 that after President Putin had decided to attack Georgia prior to the May 2008 inauguration of Dmitry Medvedev as President of Russia, a military action was planned and explicit orders were issued in advance before August 2008. Russia aimed to stop Georgia's accession to NATO and also to bring about a "regime change".

2010s

2014: Ukraine 

In 2014, Ukraine had the Revolution of Dignity and overthrew Viktor Yanukovych. On 6 March 2014, the Crimean Parliament voted to "enter into the Russian Federation with the rights of a subject of the Russian Federation" and later held a referendum asking the people of these regions whether they wanted to join Russia as a federal subject, or if they wanted to restore the 1992 Crimean constitution and Crimea's status as a part of Ukraine. Crimea and Sevastopol formally declared independence as the Republic of Crimea and requested that they be admitted as constituents of the Russian Federation. On 18 March 2014, Russia and Crimea signed a treaty of accession of the Republic of Crimea and Sevastopol in the Russian Federation, though the United Nations General Assembly voted in favor of a non-binding statement to oppose Russia's annexation of the peninsula.

Pro-Russian hackers launched a series of cyber attacks over several days to disrupt the May 2014 Ukrainian presidential election, releasing hacked emails, attempting to alter vote tallies, and delaying the result with distributed denial-of-service attacks. Malware that would have displayed a graphic declaring far-right candidate Dmytro Yarosh the electoral winner was removed from Ukraine's Central Election Commission less than an hour before polls closed. Despite this, Channel One Russia "reported that Mr. Yarosh had won and broadcast the fake graphic, citing the election commission's website, even though it had never appeared there." According to Peter Ordeshook: "These faked results were geared for a specific audience in order to feed the Russian narrative that has claimed from the start that ultra-nationalists and Nazis were behind the revolution in Ukraine."

All these events set up the stage for the War in Donbas.

2016: Montenegro 

On the eve of 16 October 2016, the day of the parliamentary election in Montenegro, a group of 20 Serbian and Montenegrin citizens, including the former head of Serbian Gendarmery Bratislav Dikić, were arrested; some of them, along with other persons, including two Russian citizens, were later formally charged by the authorities of Montenegro with an attempted coup d'état. In early November 2016, Montenegro's special prosecutor for organised crime and corruption, Milivoje Katnić, alleged that "a powerful organization" that comprised about 500 people from Russia, Serbia and Montenegro was behind the coup plot. In February 2017, Montenegrin officials accused the Russian 'state structures' of being behind the attempted coup, which allegedly envisaged an attack on the Parliament of Montenegro and assassination of prime minister Milo Đukanović.

The details about the coup plot were first made public at the end of October 2016 by Serbia's prime minister Aleksandar Vučić, whose public statement on the matter stressed the role of Serbia's law enforcers, especially the Serbian Security Intelligence Agency, in thwarting it. The statement was immediately followed by an unscheduled visit to Belgrade by Nikolai Patrushev, secretary of Russia's Security Council.

According to the prime minister Duško Marković′s statements made in February 2017, the government received definitive information about the coup being prepared on 12 October 2016, when a person involved in the plot gave away the fallback scenario of his Russian minders; this information was also corroborated by the security services of NATO member countries, who helped the Montenegrin government to investigate the plot. One of the charged, Predrag Bogićević from Kragujevac, a veteran and leader of the Ravna Gora Movement, said that Saša Sinđelić informed him on a possible attack on Serbs who participated in the October 16th protest. Bogićević, in Serbian detention, said through his lawyer that there was no talks whatsoever on a coup and no mentions of Đukanović.

The Moscow–based Russian Institute for Strategic Studies (RISS), which has close ties to Russian Foreign Intelligence Service (SVR), was mentioned by mass media as one of the organisations involved in devising the coup plot; in early November 2017, Russian president Vladimir Putin sacked the RISS director, Leonid P. Reshetnikov, a ranking veteran officer of the SVR.

2020s

2020: Mali 

President Ibrahim Boubacar Keïta faced wave of protests in Mali since 5 June 2020 calling for his resignation from office caused by corruption and economic hardship. On 18 August 2020, the rebelling elements of Malian Armed Forces staged a coup against Keïta, arresting dozens of high ranking government officials and declaring Assimi Goïta as interim head of state. There are several reports suggesting that Russia was behind the coup in Mali as two coup plotters Colonel Malick Diaw and Sadio Camara were said to be trained in Russia before staging a coup.

2022: Ukraine 

In July 2022, Russian Foreign Minister Sergey Lavrov stated that Russia's goal was to overthrow the pro-Western government in Ukraine.

See also 
 Foreign interventions by the Soviet Union
 Soviet involvement in regime change
 Russian interference in the 2016 United States elections
 Russian interference in the 2018 United States elections
 Russian interference in the 2020 United States elections
 Russian interference in the 2016 Brexit referendum
 Russian interference in British politics
 United States involvement in regime change

References

Foreign relations of Russia
Politics of Russia
Foreign involvement in regime change
Neocolonialism
New Imperialism
Geopolitical rivalry